Makabe Dam is a gravity dam located in Gunma Prefecture in Japan. The dam is used for power production. The catchment area of the dam is 1737 km2. The dam impounds about 13  ha of land when full and can store 1143 thousand cubic meters of water. The construction of the dam was started on 1922 and completed in 1928.

References

Dams in Gunma Prefecture